GB-4 (Glide Bomb No.4) was a precision guided munition developed by the United States during World War II.  GB-4s used a television guidance system with the weapon being steered by a TV bombardier operating a joystick in the launch aircraft.

The first GB-4s (then known as MX-607s) were tested at Eglin Air Force Base during August of 1943.  During testing the GB-4's circular error probable accuracy was found to be . The type was ordered into production on the 15 January 1944.  Although approved for operational use, the typed suffered from reliability problems throughout testing.   

The GB-4 was briefly used in combat by the 388th Bomber Group, based in eastern England, but its performance was deemed unsatisfactory. 1,200 GB-4's were delivered to the USAAF however poor combat results lead to a decision to halt further deliveries in February 1945.

See also
 Fritz X
 GB-1
 Azon
 VB-6 Felix

References 

World War II aerial bombs of the United States
World War II weapons of the United States
Guided bombs of the United States
Television guided weapons